Haouch Snaid    is  a Lebanese local authority  in the  Baalbek District in Baalbek-Hermel Governorate.

History
In 1838, Eli Smith noted Haush Suneid   as a village in the Baalbek area.

References

Bibliography

External links
Haouch Snaid,  Localiban

Populated places in Baalbek District